Parks College Airline was an defunct airline based in the United States.

History 
In 1927, Oliver Parks founded Parks College. Parks used the umbrella name Parks Air Lines, inc. for a flight school and aircraft manufacturing operations. Parks first training aircraft in 1927 was a Travel Air 2000 biplane operated out of Lambert field with "Parks Air Lines Inc." painted on the side. Parks held publicity events such as the 1929 Gardner Trophy Air Races. The "airline" operations would take a few more years.

St. Louis (Cahokia, Illinois)-based Parks College Airlines was founded as part of Parks College in 1935. The for-profit airline used college aircraft, maintenance students, and newly trained pilots. An operations center was based at Curtiss-Stienberg Airport. Students would spend 360 hours in the dispatch center as part of their coursework.

In 1944 Oliver Parks incorporated the airline service as Parks Air Transport with the issuance of $3,500,000 in stock. In 1945 Parks petitioned the Civil Aeronautics Board for a feeder route system based out of St. Louis with scheduled flights to hubs in Chicago, Indianapolis, Memphis, Kansas City, and Sioux City with up to ten intermediate stops. The service would include mail first, then passengers using Beechcraft Model 18 aircraft. The cost for facilities was estimated at $5,500,000. Parks proposed the use of mobile terminals for low-density airports that would check in passengers, provide restrooms, serve refreshments, and drive straight to the aircraft. The airline was re-formed as Parks Air College Airlines (PACA) and was awarded the contract airmail route AM-91. The airline had not utilized the routes it was awarded, and in May 1949, Parks sold 4000 miles of its routes to Mid-Continent Airlines in a stock swap deal. On 15 September 1950, Parks operated a Douglas DC-3 with a livery of "Parks Air Lines".  Ozark Air Lines had recently lost its operating certificate from the CAB and purchased the Parks airline only days into its new service to gain its certificate and routes. Ozark would eventually merge with Trans World Airlines in 1986, which in turn would merge with American Airlines in 2001. Mid-Continent would later become part of Braniff International Airways which ceased operations in 1982.

United States/North America
Chicago
Indianapolis
Memphis
Kansas City

Fleet 
The Parks College Airline fleet consisted of the following aircraft as of 1950:

Incidents and accidents 
Parks College Airlines operated over 17 years without incident.

See also 
 List of defunct airlines of the United States

References

External links 
 Image of a Parks Air Lines DC-3
 History of Parks Air Lines

Defunct airlines of the United States
Airlines established in 1935